Hamed Hosseinzadeh (born 22 January 1987) is an Iranian professional basketball player for Petrochimi Bandar Imam in the Iranian Super League as well as for the Iranian national basketball team.

Professional career
Hosseinzadeh played the 2016–17 season with the Petrochimi Bandar Imam, he averaged 4.74 points, 1.77 rebounds and 1.89 assists. He played the 2017–18 season at the Mahram Tehran BC, he averaged 11.82 points, 3.68 rebounds and 3.59 assists. He moved to Chemidor Tehran BC in the 2018–19 season, he played in the 2019 FIBA Asia Champions Cup, where he averaged 12.3 points, 4 rebounds and 4.3 assists He moved to Petrochimi Bandar Imam for the 2019 season.

National team career
Hosseinzadeh represented the Iranian national basketball team at the 2019 FIBA Basketball World Cup in China.

References

External links
 RealGM profile

1987 births
Living people
2019 FIBA Basketball World Cup players
Iranian men's basketball players
Mahram Tehran BC players
Petrochimi Bandar Imam BC players
Point guards
Sportspeople from Tehran